Enki Catena (Enki from the Assyro-Babylonian principal water god of the Apsu, and catena from Latin meaning "chain") is a crater chain on Ganymede measuring  long.

This chain of 13 craters was probably formed by a comet which was pulled into pieces by Jupiter's gravity as it passed too close to the planet. Soon after this breakup, the 13 fragments crashed onto Ganymede in rapid succession. The Enki craters formed across the sharp boundary between areas of bright terrain and dark terrain, delimited by a thin trough running diagonally across the center of this image. The ejecta deposit surrounding the craters appears very bright on the bright terrain. Even though all the craters formed nearly simultaneously, it is difficult to discern any ejecta deposit on the dark terrain. This may be because the impacts excavated and mixed dark material into the ejecta and the resulting mix is not apparent against the dark background.

Surface features of Ganymede (moon)
Ganymede (moon)
Impact craters on Jupiter's moons